Florencia Municipal Museum is a museum located in Florencia, Cuba. It was established on 14 December 1982.

The museum holds collections on history, weaponry, archeology and natural science.

See also 
 List of museums in Cuba

References 

Museums in Cuba
Buildings and structures in Ciego de Ávila Province
Museums established in 1982
1982 establishments in Cuba
20th-century architecture in Cuba